The Organisation of Marxist–Leninist Communists of Greece ( (ΟΚΜΛΕ), OKMLE) was a minor Greek communist organisation which was established in January 1982.

The organisation merged into the Movement for a United Communist Party of Greece in 1993, together exiled Greek communists from the former Soviet Union and other ex-socialist countries, old EAM-ELAS soldiers and officers, followers of Nikolaos Zachariadis who had disconnected with Communist Party of Greece (KKE) after its destalinization the period 1953-1956 and formed the Movement for a United Communist Party of Greece, which later will be the main core for the Movement for the Reorganization of the Communist Party of Greece 1918-55.

Ideologically, OKMLE upheld the political line of the Albanian Party of Labour.

The organization published the monthly newspaper Epanastasi ('Revolution').

OKMLE did not participate in any elections.

See also
Politics of Greece

External links
Blog with some articles from Revolution and brochures of OKMLE, in Greek

Defunct communist parties in Greece
Political parties established in 1982
1982 establishments in Greece
Political parties disestablished in 1993
1993 disestablishments in Greece
Anti-revisionist organizations
Hoxhaist parties